Chris Girdler (born November 1, 1979, in Somerset, Kentucky) is an American politician and a Republican member of the Kentucky Senate who represented District 15 from January 8, 2013, to January 3, 2017.

Education
Girdler earned his BBA from Eastern Kentucky University.

Elections
2012 When District 15 Senator Vernie McGaha retired and left the seat open, Girdler won the six-way May 22, 2012 Republican Primary with 5,775 votes (49.6%) and was unopposed for the November 6, 2012 General election, winning with 36,946 votes.

References

External links
Official page at the Kentucky General Assembly

Chris Girdler at Ballotpedia
Chris Girdler at OpenSecrets

1979 births
Living people
Eastern Kentucky University alumni
Republican Party Kentucky state senators
People from Somerset, Kentucky
21st-century American politicians